Ban Pong is a tambon (subdistrict) of Phrao District, in Chiang Mai Province, Thailand. In 2005 it had a population of 4,053 people. The tambon contains eight villages.

References

Tambon of Chiang Mai province
Populated places in Chiang Mai province